Vita Vārpiņa (born 8 February 1968, in Riga) is a Latvian actress. She was awarded Best Actress in the Latvian National Film Awards, Lielais Kristaps, in 2014 for her role in Mother, I Love You.

References

Living people
1968 births
Latvian film actresses
Actors from Riga
Lielais Kristaps Award winners